A kugelblitz is a theoretical astrophysical object predicted by general relativity. It is a concentration of heat, light or radiation so intense that its energy forms an event horizon and becomes self-trapped. In other words, if enough radiation is aimed into a region of space, the concentration of energy can warp spacetime so much that it creates a black hole. This would be a black hole whose original mass–energy was in the form of radiant energy rather than matter, however as soon as it forms, it is indistinguishable from an ordinary Black Hole, meaning there is currently no way to trace the origins of a Black Hole.

John Archibald Wheeler's 1955 Physical Review paper entitled "geons" refers to the kugelblitz phenomena and explores the idea of creating such particles (or toy models of particles) from spacetime curvature.

The kugelblitz phenomenon has been considered a possible basis for interstellar engines (drives) for future black hole starships.

See also 
 Bekenstein bound
 Ronald Mallett
 Micro black hole

References 

Black holes
General relativity
Light